Yarlagadda is both a given name and a surname.

Notable people with the name include:

Yarlagadda Nayudamma (born 1947), Indian surgeon
Yarlagadda Lakshmi Prasad (born 1953), Indian writer
Pratima Yarlagadda (born 1981), actress
Shobu Yarlagadda (born 1971), Indian film producer
Sri Vyshnavi Yarlagadda (born 1995), Indian athlete